Wiltrud Drexel (born 16 August 1950) is an Austrian former alpine skier and Olympic medalist. She received a bronze medal in the giant slalom at the 1972 Winter Olympics in Sapporo.

References

External links
 
 
 

1950 births
Living people
Olympic alpine skiers of Austria
Austrian female alpine skiers
Alpine skiers at the 1972 Winter Olympics
Olympic bronze medalists for Austria
Olympic medalists in alpine skiing
FIS Alpine Ski World Cup champions
Medalists at the 1972 Winter Olympics
People from Feldkirch, Vorarlberg
Sportspeople from Vorarlberg
20th-century Austrian women
21st-century Austrian women